The Erie people (also Eriechronon, Riquéronon, Erielhonan, Eriez, Nation du Chat) were Indigenous people historically living on the south shore of Lake Erie. An Iroquoian group, they lived in what is now western New York, northwestern Pennsylvania, and northern Ohio before 1658. Their nation was decimated in the mid-17th century by five years of prolonged warfare with the powerful neighboring Iroquois for helping the Huron in the Beaver Wars for control of the fur trade.
 
Their villages were burned as a lesson to those who dared oppose the Iroquois. This destroyed their stored maize and other foods, added to their loss of life, and threatened their future, as they had no way to survive the winter. The attacks likely forced their emigration. The Iroquois League was known for adopting captives and refugees into their tribes. The surviving Erie are believed to have been largely absorbed by other Iroquoian tribes, particularly families of the Seneca, the westernmost of the Five Nations.  Susquehannock families may also have adopted some Erie, as the tribes had shared the hunting grounds of the Allegheny Plateau and Amerindian paths that passed through the gaps of the Allegheny. The members of remnant tribes living among the Iroquois gradually assimilated to the majority cultures, losing their independent tribal identities.

The Erie were also called the Chat ("Cat" in French) or "Long Tail" (referring, possibly, to the raccoon tails worn on clothing). Like other Iroquoian peoples, they lived in multifamily long houses in villages enclosed in palisades. These defensive works often encompassed their fields for crops. They cultivated the "Three Sisters": varieties of corn, beans, and squash, during the warm season. In winter, tribal members lived off the stored crops and animals taken in hunts.

Language
The Erie spoke the Erie language, an unattested Iroquoian language said to have been similar to Wyandot.

Territory 
The known boundaries of Erie lands extended from the Allegheny River to the shores of Lake Erie. They were once believed, due to a misidentification of villages by early French explorers mapping the Great Lakes, to control all the land from northwestern Pennsylvania to about Sandusky, Ohio, but archaeologists have now attributed the western half of that to a whole other culture referred to as the Whittlesey's, who were likely an Algonquian people.  A site assumed to have been Erie at Conneaut, Ohio was later reattributed to the Whittlesey, who surrounded their villages with earthen mounds instead of wooden palisades but were also living in Longhouses, rather than wigwams, by the time of European Contact. However, a second village on the east side of the river likely had been an Erie settlement.  Another Erie settlement was discovered in Windsor, Ohio, at the southwestern corner of Ashtabula County, which is two river valleys further west than the sites at Conneaut.  No significant settlement remains from prior to the Beaver Wars was ever documented in Trumbull or Mahoning Counties, leaving the exact border between the two peoples in question.

At the time the Erie existed, their immediate neighbors included the Neutral Nation, across Lake Erie, the Petun to the north, between the Genessee and Niagara Rivers, the Susquehannock east of the Allegheny River and two historically unknown nations- the Monongahela culture to the south of the Allegheny River (named for the Monongahela River, which itself was named after a nickname for the Lenape, who lived there later) and the Whittlesey culture to the west. The Monongahela Culture was most likely a Siouan-speaking society.

History

Precontact 

While Indigenous peoples lived along the Great Lakes for thousands of years in succeeding cultures, historic tribes known at the time of European encounter began to coalesce by the 15th and 16th centuries. The Erie were among the several Iroquoian peoples sharing a similar culture, tribal organization, and speaking an Iroquoian language which emerged around the Great Lakes, but with elements that may have originated in the south. People from the Whittlesey tradition and Fort Ancient culture of Ohio and Pennsylvania may have been ancestors of the Erie people.

Iroquoian oral history suggests the Erie descended from them and that they descended from peoples living in the St. Lawrence River Valley. It also says the Eries defeated an unknown tribal who built earthworks., but names given for this group of uncertain origin- with one using Alligewi, the Lenape word for the Erie themselves and the other account using Squawkihaw, the word the Iroquois used for the Meskwaki. Neither group built the mounds in question- three of which were excavated by archaeologists in Pennsylvania and Ohio. These are Sugar Run Mound, North Benton Mound  and Towner's Mound. Only Towner's Mound, in Kent, Ohio, still stands. Linguists who have studied the handful of words on record believed to be of Erie origin believe the tribe was closer to the Huron than the Iroquois, however. If descended from the Iroquois, archaeology suggests they couldn't have arrived before the 12th or 13th centuries. A Huron origin would suggest them arriving even later.

The editors of New American Heritage state the various confederacies of Iroquoian tribes migrated from south to the Great Lakes regions and in between well before pre-Columbian times. Conversely, others such as the editors of the 1911 Encyclopædia Britannica suggest the tribes originated in what became Algonkian territories along the Saint Lawrence and moved west and south when the Algonquian tribes moved north up the coast and spread west.

Post-contact 
By the time of European encounter, Algonquian and Iroquoian tribes were competitive, although they were known to conduct trading and spent most years in uneasy peace. Separation between tribes living in wilderness ensured contacts were mainly small affairs before the use firearms tipped the balance of warfare to enhance the killing ability of a people who could not outrun a bullet, a limitation which existed before guns and the ability to kill at range.
Rivalries and habitual competition among American Indians tribes for resources (especially fire arms) and power was escalated by the lucrative returns of the fur trade with French and Dutch colonists beginning settlements in the greater area before 1611.  Violence to control the fur-bearing territories, the beginnings of the long-running  Beaver Wars, began early in the 17th century so the normal peace and trading activity decreased between the tribes, who had responded to demand for beaver and other furs by over-hunting some areas.

The Erie encroached on territory that other tribes considered theirs. During 1651, they'd angered their eastern neighbors, the Iroquois League, by accepting Huron refugees from villages which had been destroyed by the Iroquois. Though reported as using poison-tipped arrows (Jesuit Relations 41:43, 1655–58 chap. XI), the Erie were disadvantaged in armed conflict with the Iroquois because they had few firearms.  Beginning in 1653 the Erie launched a preemptive attack on western tribes of the Iroquois, and did well in the first year of a five-year war.
 
Consequently, in 1654 the whole Iroquois Confederacy went to war against the Erie and neighboring tribes such as the Neutral people along the northern shores of Lake Erie and across the Niagara River, the Tobacco people between the Erie and Iroquois, neighbors to all three groups. As a result, over five years of war they destroyed the Erie confederacy, the Neutrals, the Tobacco, with the tribes surviving in remnants. By the mid-1650s, the Erie had become a broken tribe. Dispersed groups survived a few more decades before being absorbed into the Iroquois, especially the westernmost Seneca nation.

Historically the Monacan and Erie were trade allies, especially copper, but years later that relationship fell apart due to growing colonial pressure.

Because the Erie were located further from the coastal areas of early European exploration, they had little direct contact with Europeans. Only the Dutch fur traders from Fort Orange (now Albany, New York) and Jesuit missionaries in Canada referred to them in historic records. The Jesuits learned more about them during the Beaver Wars, but most of what they learned, aside from a single in-person encounter, was learned from the Huron who suffered much reduction before the Erie did. What little is known about them has been derived from oral history of other Native American tribes, archaeology, and comparisons with other Iroquoian peoples.

After the Haudenosaunee routed the Erie in 1654 and 1656, the group dispersed. In 1680, a remnant group of Erie surrendered to the Seneca people. Erie descendants merged with Haudenosaunee in Ohio, who lived on the Upper Sandusky Reservation from 1817 to 1832, when Ohio forcibly removed its tribes to Indian Territory. These included the tribes who would form the present-day Seneca-Cayuga Nation in Oklahoma.

See also 
 Mingo
 Neutral Nation
 Wenrohronon
 Shawnee
 Susquehannock people

Notes

Footnotes

References

External links 
 Seneca-Cayuga Nation
 Erie Indians, Encyclopedia of Cleveland History
 Erie, Encyclopedia of Oklahoma History and Culture

Extinct Native American tribes
Iroquoian peoples
Indigenous peoples of the Northeastern Woodlands
Great Lakes tribes
Native American tribes in Ohio
Native American tribes in Pennsylvania
Native American tribes in West Virginia
Prehistoric cultures in Ohio